St. Christopher's Church, or Saint Christopher Church, or variations, may refer to:

Germany 

 St. Christoph's Church, Mainz

Great Britain 
 St Christopher's Church, Bare, England
 St Christopher's Church, Pott Shrigley, England
 St Christopher's Church, Springfield, England
 St Christopher's Church of England High School, Accrington, England
 St Christopher's Church, Sneinton, England
 Saint Christopher's Church, Boughton Lees, England
 St Christopher's Church, Lympsham, England
 Church of St Christopher, Norris Green, England
 St Christopher le Stocks, England

Italy 
 St. Christopher's Church, Monte Sperello, Italy

United States of America 
 St. Christopher's Church (Red Hook, New York)

See also
St Christopher's Chapel (disambiguation)